Marie Goldschmidt aka Mme. (Gustave) Goldschmidt born Marie Kann (1890–1917) was a French aeronaut who co-piloted a balloon world distance record in 1913 of over 2,400 km. She was the first woman to enter an Fédération Aéronautique Internationale balloon race when she finished sixth in the Gordon Bennett Cup.

Life
She was born in 1890 and named Marie Kann. She married a man called Gustave or Gustavo Goldschmidt and frequently used his name as "Madame Gustave Goldschmidt". Her parentage and place of birth are not known. She came to notice as a balloonist. In 1911 she was flying with Marie Surcouf who was the President of the French balloon club for women aeronauts known as "La Stella" and with Beatrix de Rijk an Indonesian Dutch balloon pilot and the first Dutch woman to earn an aviator pilot's license.

When they arrived in Russia they were given a reception by Robert Fulda and Stephan Ivanovitch Osoviecki of the Sports Club of the Moscow Imperial Aeronautics Society.
 
Later that year she and Rumpelmayer entered the eighth annual balloon distance competition (The Gordon Bennett Cup) in October 1913. The competition had begun in 1906 and it continues each year as the "premier event of world balloon racing". The first woman to enter this competition was Goldschmidt, in fact she was the first woman to enter any FAI balloon race anywhere. They set off from Paris and finished out of twenty one entries. They travelled 437 km and they were the best French team. The first woman pilot in that competition, was not until the 1980s.

Her exploits as an aeronaut ceased when war broke out. She died in 1917 as a nurse.

References

1890 births
1917 deaths
French balloonists
Nurses killed in World War I